The Flint Institute of Arts, also called FIA, is located in the Flint Cultural Center in Flint, Michigan. The second largest art museum in Michigan, it offers exhibitions, interpretive programs, film screenings, concerts, lectures, family events and educational outreach programs to people of various ages, serving over 160,000 adults and children a year.

History
The Flint Institute of Arts was established in 1928 by leaders in the community who wanted a place where students could pursue art courses and the community could enjoy exhibitions. In 1958, FIA moved to its current location in the Flint Cultural Center. After a much needed renovation in 2005, the current facility is 150,000 sq. ft., with over 25,000 sq. ft. of gallery space.

About
The Flint Institute of Arts is the second largest art museum in the State of Michigan and one of the largest museum art schools in the nation. Each year, more than 160,000 people visit the FIA’s galleries and participate in FIA programs and services.

For 90 years, the FIA has been responsible for acquiring, protecting and presenting a collection of art and artifacts spanning continents and 5,000 years. The collection, which  exceeds 8,000 objects, is significant for its depth of important European and American paintings and sculptures, 15th century to the present, and its holdings of decorative and applied arts including important ethnographic study collections dating back five millennia.

Accreditation and grants
 Accreditations American Association of Museums (now the American Alliance of Museums)
Grants
 2015: Received a $1.96 million operating grant from the Charles Stewart Mott Foundation
 2016: Received a $100,000 grant from PNC for the FIA's START Program

Collection and exhibitions
The permanent collection includes more than 8,000 works of art. Highlights of the collection include: 15th to 18th century English, French, and Italian decorative arts, a rare shaped panel by Peter Paul Rubens, a complete set of 17th century French tapestries; American and French Impressionist and Post-Impressionist paintings, Hudson River School paintings, Regional and Great Lakes paintings, and Abstract Expressionist and Photorealist paintings.

The Flint Institute of Arts has assembled outstanding collections of American, European, Native American, African, and Asian art including paintings, sculptures, prints, drawings, and decorative arts.

Some of the renowned artists that are featured in the collection are Auguste Renoir, John Singer Sargent, Mary Cassatt, Thomas Hart Benton, Andrew Wyeth, Duane Hanson, and Barbara Sorensen.

FIA also has multiple exhibitions that it puts on during the year. Some exhibitions that have been featured are Picasso, Rodin, Toulouse-Lautrec, and Jerry Taliaferro.

References

Art museums and galleries in Michigan
Buildings and structures in Flint, Michigan
Museums in Genesee County, Michigan
Institutions accredited by the American Alliance of Museums
1928 establishments in Michigan
Art museums established in 1928
Tourist attractions in Flint, Michigan
Art schools in Michigan
Education in Flint, Michigan